Vigliotti is an Italian surname. Notable people with the surname include:

Jonathan Vigliotti (born 1983), American television journalist
Ray Vigliotti (born 1960), American soccer player

Italian-language surnames